State Road 53 (NM 53) is a state highway in the US state of New Mexico. NM 53's western terminus is a continuation as Arizona State Route 61 (AZ 61) at the Arizona border west-southwest of Zuni, and the eastern terminus at NM 122 in the village of Grants.

History

NM 53 was originally the east end of NM 54 and then after 1927 a short route extending west from Grants, it was extended over old NM 36 to the Arizona border by the 1940s. It was renamed as NM 53 to avoid confusion with U.S. Route 54 (US 54). In the 1940s, NM 53 was extended northeast from Milan to San Mateo, a small town near Mt. Taylor. The segment from Milan to San Mateo was renumbered NM 605 in 1988.

Major intersections

See also

 List of state roads in New Mexico

References

External links

053
Transportation in McKinley County, New Mexico